Mark Roysten Gregory Loram (born 12 January 1971) is a former British motorcycle speedway rider who won the World Speedway Championship in 2000 and won the British Championship in 1997, 1999, and 2001.

Career
Born in Mtarfa, Malta, Mark Loram started his career with the Hackney Kestrels in 1987. In 1999 Loram became the first rider in Speedway Grand Prix history to win a GP whilst being entered as a wild card, a feat only repeated three times since (as at the end of the 2012 season). He won two Grand Prix in his career; 1997 Danish Grand Prix in Vojens and 1999 when he won the Swedish Grand Prix in Linköping.

Loram became the Speedway World Champion in 2000 despite not winning any of the Grand Prix meetings held that year, the only rider to ever do so. However he was the only rider to reach the semi-finals in all six meetings which along with runner-up placings in the opening two rounds in the Czech Republic and Sweden as well as a third in Britain in Round 4 gave him enough points to secure his first and only world title. Loram scored 102 points over the six rounds to defeat 1996 champion Billy Hamill (who won the Czech Republic and European GP's) on 95 and defending champion Tony Rickardsson (who won in Poland) on 94. Loram's win saw him become the 7th British rider to win speedway's ultimate individual prize.

Loram has also been British Champion three times, in 1997, 1999 and 2001. In March 2007 Loram broke his thigh and dislocated his arm whilst riding in the opening fixture of the Elite League season for the Ipswich Witches. This ended his involvement in the sport for 2007, and he was unable to ride in 2008 and 2009. On 17 December 2009, Loram officially announced his retirement from speedway.

World Final Appearances
 1994 -  Vojens, Speedway Center - 8th - 9pts

Speedway Grand Prix results

World Longtrack Championship

Finals

 1990 -   Herxheim 15pts (10th)
 1991 -   Marianske Lazne 8pts (10th)
 1992 -   Pfarrkirchen 18pts (5th)
 1993 -   Muhldorf 5pts (14th)
 1994 -   Marianske Lazne 9pts (10th)

British Grasstrack Championship

First
1991 & 1993.

References

External links
 http://grasstrackgb.co.uk/mark-loram/

1971 births
Living people
Maltese sportspeople
British speedway riders
Individual Speedway World Champions
British Speedway Championship winners
Polonia Bydgoszcz riders
Eastbourne Eagles riders
Ipswich Witches riders
Lakeside Hammers riders
Peterborough Panthers riders
Poole Pirates riders
Wolverhampton Wolves riders
King's Lynn Stars riders
Exeter Falcons riders
Individual Speedway Long Track World Championship riders
People from Mtarfa